The Deep End is the twenty-seventh album by Spyro Gyra, released on May 25, 2004. The album peaked at No. 3 on the jazz album chart at Billboard magazine.

Critical reception 

Tom Hull dismissed the album as a "dud" in his "Jazz Consumer Guide" for The Village Voice in September 2004. In a commentary published on his website, he explained, "Spry funk, thick layers of guitar-keyb-sax that never let up, occasional tidbits of exotica, they don't aim for pablum, but they don't take risks either, so in the end they're as predictable as formula."

Track listing 
 "Summer Fling" (Jeremy Wall) – 4:58
 "Eastlake Shuffle" (Julio Fernandez) – 5:02
 "Monsoon" (Jay Beckenstein) – 7:00
 "As You Wish" (Beckenstein) – 4:36
 "Joburg Jam" (Beckenstein) – 6:10
 "The Crossing" (Fernandez) – 7:17
 "Wiggle Room" (Scott Ambush) – 6:48
 "Wind Warriors" (Tom Schuman) – 6:15
 "In Your Arms" (Schuman) – 4:46
 "Chippewa Street" (Beckenstein) – 5:46
 "Beyond the Rain" (Ambush) – 6:09

Personnel 

Spyro Gyra
 Jay Beckenstein – saxophones
 Tom Schuman – keyboards
 Julio Fernández – guitars, vocals (6)
 Scott Ambush – bass guitar

Guest musicians
 Billy Kilson – drums (1, 4, 10)
 Joel Rosenblatt – drums (2, 3, 6-9, 11)
 Ludwig Afonso – drums (5)
 Cyro Baptista – percussion (1, 3, 6)
 Daniel Sadownick – percussion (1-4, 7, 10, 11)
 Dave Samuels – vibraphone (4, 5, 7, 11)
 David Charles – percussion (8, 9)
 Don Harris – trumpet (1, 10)

Production 
 Jay Beckenstein – producer
 Jeremy Wall – producer (1)
 Julio Fernández – producer (2, 6)
 Scott Ambush – producer (7, 11)
 Tom Schuman – producer (8, 9)
 Doug Oberkircher – recording, mixing 
 Eric Carlinsky – recording, assistant engineer 
 Scott Hull – mastering 
 Robert Hoffman – art direction, design

Studios
 Recorded and Mixed at BearTracks Studios (Suffern, New York).
 Mastered at The Hit Factory (New York City, New York).

References

2004 albums
Spyro Gyra albums
Heads Up International albums